Parkhomenko or Parkhomenka is a Ukrainian and Belarusian surname. It may refer to:
 Adam Parkhomenko (born 1985), American political strategist
 Aliaksandr Parkhomenka (born 1981), Belarusian decathlete
 Andriy Parkhomenko (born 1971), Ukrainian football coach
 Feofan Parkhomenko (1893–1962), Soviet general
 Ihor Parkhomenko (born 1972), Ukrainian archer
 Kostyantyn Parkhomenko (born 1991), Ukrainian football player
 Natalia Parhomenko (born 1979), Ukrainian handballer
 Oksana Parkhomenko (born 1984), Azerbaijani volleyball player
 Sergey Parkhomenko (disambiguation), multiple individuals
 Serhii Parkhomenko (1997–2022), Ukrainian military serviceman
 Svetlana Parkhomenko (born 1962), Russian tennis player
 Tereshko Parkhomenko (1872–1910), Ukrainian kobzar
 Volodymyr Parkhomenko (born 1957), Ukrainian football coach
 Yegor Parkhomenko (born 2002), Belarusian footballer
Yelena Parkhomenko (born 1982), Azerbaijani volleyball player

See also
 

Ukrainian-language surnames